"I Wanna Be Adored" is a song by the British rock band the Stone Roses. It was the first track on their debut album, The Stone Roses, and was released as a single. The US release charted at number 18 on the Billboard Modern Rock chart in 1990. In 1991, the single was released in the UK, Germany and Japan featuring previously unreleased B-sides.

Composition
"I Wanna Be Adored" begins with a collage of sounds. The first instrument to enter is the bass guitar, which appears 40 seconds in. This is followed by two guitars, one of which plays a pentatonic scale riff. The bass drum enters at 1:13, and the main portion of the song begins at 1:30.

The song is performed in the key of G. The song features two main sections: a four bar G–D–G–D–Em chord progression, followed by an eight-bar bridge that shifts from D to C repeatedly. The song's lyrics are minimalist, mainly consisting of the lines "I don't have/need to sell my soul/He's already in me" and the song's title repeated throughout the entire song.

Reception
In 2006, the music magazine Q voted it 32nd in its list of 100 greatest songs of all time. In May 2007, NME magazine placed "I Wanna Be Adored" at number 17 in its list of the 50 Greatest Indie Anthems Ever. VH2 placed the song at number two on the Indie 500, a countdown of their top 500 indie songs of all time. Though "There Is a Light That Never Goes Out" by the Smiths was at number one, on a condensed version showing just the top 50, the two songs had swapped places, with "Adored" at number one. Stylus Magazine also included the song's bassline at number 17 in their 2005 list of the Top 50 Basslines of All Time.

In popular culture 
The song features in the 2005 film Green Street.

Oasis refer to the Stone Roses by quoting "I Wanna Be Adored" in their 1997 song "Magic Pie": "They are sleeping while they dream/ but then they wanna be adored".

Music video
The music video for "I Wanna Be Adored" was made concurrently with "Fools Gold" for the American release of the single in 1989; hence the videos share similar visual effects and scenery. The videos were both filmed near the A57 Snake Pass between Sheffield and Manchester, in the same location that Inspiral Carpets used for the video of their song "This Is How It Feels."

Track listing

1989 US release

12-inch vinyl (Silvertone 1301-1-JD) Cassette (Silvertone 1301-4-JS) CD (Silvertone 1301-2-JD)
 "I Wanna Be Adored" (edit) – 3:28
 "I Wanna Be Adored" – 4:52
 "Going Down" – 2:46
 "Simone" – 4:24

1991 UK release

7-inch vinyl (Silvertone ORE 31) Cassette (Silvertone ORE C 31)
 "I Wanna Be Adored" – 3:28
 "Where Angels Play" – 4:15

12-inch vinyl (Silvertone ORE T 31)
 "I Wanna Be Adored" – 4:52
 "Where Angels Play" – 4:15
 "Sally Cinnamon" (Live at the Hacienda) – 3:52

CD (Silvertone ORE CD 31)
 "I Wanna Be Adored" (7" version) – 3:28
 "Where Angels Play" – 4:15
 "I Wanna Be Adored" (12" version) – 4:53
 "Sally Cinnamon" (Live at the Hacienda) – 3:52

1991 Japanese release

CD (Silvertone/Alfa ALCB-392)
 "I Wanna Be Adored" (12" version) – 4:53
 "Where Angels Play" – 4:15
 "Sally Cinnamon" (Live at the Hacienda) – 3:52
 "Fools Gold" (Extended version) – 9:53

Charts

Certifications

Cover versions
Cover versions of I Wanna Be Adored have been recorded by the following musical groups and artists:
 Death Cab for Cutie - Live bonus track on the Deluxe Edition of The Photo Album (2001)
 Year of the Rabbit – Hunted EP (2003)
 Tangerine – Song for the Now and Others Forever (2004)
 Monsters Are Waiting – Ones And Zeros EP (2008)
 The Raveonettes – as part of Dr. Martens 50th anniversary (2010)
 Badly Drawn Boy – live
 Lana Mir – Goodbye Girl EP (2010)
 Teron Beal – Liquor Store (2010)
 Eagulls – as part of The A.V. Club A.V. Undercover series (2014)
 King Woman - I Wanna Be Adored digital single (2018)
 Metallica - live at the Etihad Stadium (2019)

References
Rooksby, Rikki. Inside Classic Rock Tracks. Backbeat, 2001.

Notes

External links
The Definitive Stone Roses Discography entry 

1989 singles
The Stone Roses songs
Song recordings produced by John Leckie
Songs written by Ian Brown
Songs written by John Squire
1989 songs
Song recordings produced by Martin Hannett
Music based on the Faust legend